Meerayude Dukhavum Muthuvinte Swapnavum (English: Meera's Woe and Muthu's dream) is a 2003 Malayalam film by Vinayan, starring Prithviraj Sukumaran and Ambili Devi and produced by Tom George Kolath. This movie is about a brother protecting his disabled sister. The film is based on Porkkaalam (1997).

Plot
Muthu and his younger sister Meera, who is crippled, live with their caring grandmother and uncle Suseelan. Muthu works in a brick factory; for providing his sister a better life. He falls in love with Aswathy and meets a mysterious man named Siddan. Muthu's Meeting with Siddan changes the plot of the story.

Cast

Prithviraj Sukumaran ...  Muthu, brother of Meera
Ambili Devi ...  Meera, sister of Muthu
Renuka Menon ...  Aswathy, Muthu's Love interest
Jagathy Sreekumar ...  Suseelan 
Cochin Haneefa ...  Divakaran 
Philomina ...  Meera and Muthu's grandmother 
Sudheesh ...  Rajendran 
Indrans ...  Chandran 
 Sivaji ...  Muthalali 
Machan Varghese ...  Kanaran 
Rizabawa ...  Advocate 
 Manka Mahesh  ...  Ammini 
Remya Nambeesan...  Aswathy's sister
Yamuna ... Rajendran's mother
Sridevika as Rajendran's sister
Joemon Joshy ...  Vimal Kumar
Geetha Salam
Sajeev Kumar

References

External links
 

2000s Malayalam-language films
2003 drama films
2003 films
Films directed by Vinayan
Films scored by Mohan Sithara